BBC Brasil  is the subsidiary of the BBC in Brazil. Acting as world news provider in Portuguese and news agency, BBC Brasil possesses resources such as physical installed branches in São Paulo and Rio de Janeiro and a team specially assigned in London.

References

External links
 
Mobile 

Brazil